"The Legend of Sleepy Hollow" is a short story by American author Washington Irving, contained in his collection of 34 essays and short stories titled The Sketch Book of Geoffrey Crayon, Gent. Written while Irving was living abroad in Birmingham, England, "The Legend of Sleepy Hollow" was first published in 1820. 

Along with Irving's companion piece "Rip Van Winkle", "The Legend of Sleepy Hollow" is among the earliest examples of American fiction with enduring popularity, especially during Halloween because of a character known as the Headless Horseman believed to be a Hessian soldier who was decapitated by a cannonball in battle. In 1949, the second film adaptation was produced by Walt Disney as one of two segments in the package film The Adventures of Ichabod and Mr. Toad.

Plot

The story is set in 1790 in the countryside around the Dutch settlement of Tarry Town (historical Tarrytown, New York), in a secluded glen known as Sleepy Hollow. Sleepy Hollow is renowned for its ghosts and the haunting atmosphere that pervades the imaginations of its inhabitants and visitors. Some residents say this town was bewitched during the early days of the Dutch settlement, while others claim that the mysterious atmosphere was caused by an old Native American chief, the "wizard of his tribe ... before the country was discovered by Master Hendrik Hudson." Residents of the town are seemingly subjected to various supernatural and mysterious occurrences. They are subjected to trance-like visions and frequented by strange sights, music, and voices "in the air." The inhabitants of Sleepy Hollow are fascinated by the "local tales, haunted spots, and twilight superstitions" on account of the mysterious occurrences and haunting atmosphere. The most infamous spectre in the Hollow is the Headless Horseman, the "commander-in-chief of all the powers of the air," (an attribute also of the Devil, according to Ephesians 2:2). He is supposedly the restless ghost of a Hessian trooper whose head had been shot off by a stray cannonball during "some nameless battle" of the Revolution, and who "rides forth to the scene of battle in nightly quest of his head".

The "Legend" relates the tale of Ichabod Crane, a lean, lanky and extremely superstitious schoolmaster from Connecticut. Throughout his stay at Sleepy Hollow, Crane is able to make himself both "useful and agreeable" to the families that he lodges with. He occasionally assists with light farm work, helping to make hay, mend fences, caring for numerous farm animals, and cutting firewood. Besides his more dominant role as the Schoolmaster, Ichabod Crane also assists the various mothers of the town by helping to take care of their young children, taking on a more "gentle and ingratiating" role. Crane is also quite popular among the women of the town for his education and his talent for "carrying the whole budget of local gossip," which makes him a welcomed sight within female circles. As a firm believer in witchcraft and the like, Crane has an unequaled "appetite for the marvelous," which is only increased by his stay in "the spell-bound region" of Sleepy Hollow. A source of "fearful pleasure" for Crane is to visit the Old Dutch wives and listen to their "marvelous tales of ghosts and goblins," haunted locations, and the tales of the Headless Horseman, or the "Galloping Hessian of the Hollow, as they sometimes called him."
Throughout the story, Ichabod Crane competes with Abraham "Brom Bones" Van Brunt, the town rowdy and local hero, for the hand of 18-year-old Katrina Van Tassel, the daughter and sole child of wealthy farmer Baltus Van Tassel. Ichabod Crane, an outsider, sees marriage to Katrina as a means of procuring Van Tassel's extravagant wealth. Brom, unable to force Ichabod into a physical showdown to settle things, plays a series of pranks on the superstitious schoolmaster. The tension among the three continues for some time, and is soon brought to a head. On a placid autumn night, the ambitious Crane attends a harvest party at the Van Tassels' homestead. He dances, partakes in the feast, and listens to ghostly legends told by Brom and the locals, but his true aim is to propose to Katrina after the guests leave. His intentions, however, are ill-fated, as he fails to secure Katrina's hand.

Following his rejected suit, Ichabod rides home on his temperamental plough horse named Gunpowder, "heavy-hearted and crestfallen" through the woods between Van Tassel's farmstead and the farmhouse in Sleepy Hollow where he is quartered at the time. As he passes several purportedly haunted spots, his active imagination is engorged by the ghost stories told at Baltus' harvest party. After nervously passing a lightning-stricken tulip tree purportedly haunted by the ghost of British spy Major André, Ichabod encounters a cloaked rider at an intersection in a menacing swamp. Unsettled by his fellow traveller's eerie size and silence, the teacher is horrified to discover that his companion's head is not on his shoulders, but on his saddle. In a frenzied race to the bridge adjacent to the Old Dutch Burying Ground, where the Hessian is said to "vanish, according to rule, in a flash of fire and brimstone" before crossing it, Ichabod rides for his life, desperately goading Gunpowder down the Hollow. However, while Crane and Gunpowder are able to cross the bridge ahead of the ghoul, Ichabod turns back in horror to see the monster rear his horse and hurl his severed head directly at him with a fierce motion. The schoolmaster attempts to dodge, but is too late; the missile strikes his head and sends him tumbling headlong into the dust from his horse.

The next morning, Gunpowder is found eating the grass at his master's gate, but Ichabod has mysteriously disappeared from the area, leaving Katrina to later marry Brom Bones, who was said "to look exceedingly knowing whenever the story of Ichabod was related". Indeed, the only relics of the schoolmaster's flight are his discarded hat, Gunpowder's trampled saddle, and a mysterious shattered pumpkin. Although the true nature of both the Headless Horseman and Ichabod's disappearance that night are left open to interpretation, the story implies that the Horseman was really Brom (an extremely agile rider) in disguise, using a Jack-o'-lantern as a false head, and suggests that Crane survived the fall from Gunpowder and immediately fled Sleepy Hollow in horror, never to return but to prosper elsewhere, or was killed by Brom (which may be unlikely, since Brom was said to have "more mischief than ill-will in his composition"). Irving's narrator concludes the story, however, by stating that the old Dutch wives continue to promote the belief that Ichabod was "spirited away by supernatural means", and a legend develops around his disappearance and sightings of his melancholy spirit.

In a Postscript (sometimes unused in certain editions), the narrator states the circumstances in which he heard the story from an old gentleman "at a Corporation meeting at the ancient city of Manhattoes", who didn't "believe one-half of it [himself]."

Background

Irving wrote The Sketch Book during a tour of Europe, and parts of the tale may also be traced to European origins. Headless horsemen were staples of Northern Europe storytelling, featuring in German, Irish (e.g., Dullahan), Scandinavian (e.g., the Wild Hunt), and British legends, and were included in Robert Burns's Scots poem "Tam o' Shanter" (1790) and Bürger's Der Wilde Jäger, translated as The Wild Huntsman (1796). Usually viewed as omens of ill fortune for those who chose to disregard their apparitions, these specters found their victims in proud, scheming persons and characters with hubris and arrogance. One particularly influential rendition of this folktale was the last of the "" from J. K. A. Musäus's literary retellings of German folktales  (1783).

During the height of the American Revolutionary War, Irving writes that the country surrounding Tarrytown "was one of those highly-favored places which abound with chronicle and great men. The British and American line had run near it during the war; it had, therefore, been the scene of marauding, and infested with refugees, cow-boys, and all kinds of border chivalry."

After the Battle of White Plains in October 1776, the country south of the Bronx River was abandoned by the Continental Army and occupied by the British. The Americans were fortified north of Peekskill, leaving Westchester County a 30-mile stretch of scorched and desolated no-man's-land, vulnerable to outlaws, raiders, and vigilantes. Besides droves of Loyalist rangers and British light infantry, Hessian Jägers—renowned sharpshooters and horsemen—were among the raiders who often skirmished with Patriot militias. The Headless Horseman, said to be a decapitated Hessian soldier, may have indeed been based loosely on the discovery of just such a Jäger's headless corpse found in Sleepy Hollow after a violent skirmish, and later buried by the Van Tassel family, in an unmarked grave in the Old Dutch Burying Ground. The dénouement of the fictional tale is set at the bridge over the Pocantico River in the area of the Old Dutch Church and Burying Ground in Sleepy Hollow.

According to another hypothesis, the figure of the "headless rider" Irving could have been drawn from German literature, and more precisely from the Chronicle of Szprotawa by J.G. Kreis written in the first half of the 19th century. In the nineteenth century, the police counselor Kreis noted that in the eighteenth / twentieth century the inhabitants of this city were afraid to move after dusk on Hospitalstrasse (now Sądowa Street) due to the headless rider apparition seen there.
In support of the hypothesis, according to information taken from the work by Z.Sinko entitled Polish Reception of Washington Irving's Work: Between Enlightenment and Romanticism from 1988, Walter Scott encouraged Irving to learn German to be able to read stories, ballads and legends in their native language.

Irving, while he was an aide-de-camp to New York Governor Daniel D. Tompkins, met an army captain named Ichabod Crane in Sackets Harbor, New York during an inspection tour of fortifications in 1814.  Irving may have patterned the character in "The Legend" after Jesse Merwin, who taught at the local schoolhouse in Kinderhook, further north along the Hudson River, where Irving spent several months in 1809. The inspiration for the character of Katrina Van Tassel was based on an actual young woman by that name. Washington Irving had stayed with her family for a short time and asked permission to use her name and loosely base the character on her. He told her and her family, he liked to give his characters the names of people he had met.

The story was the longest one published as part of The Sketch Book of Geoffrey Crayon, Gent. (commonly referred to as The Sketch Book), which Irving issued serially throughout 1819 and 1820, using the pseudonym "Geoffrey Crayon". With "Rip Van Winkle", "The Legend of Sleepy Hollow" is one of Irving's most anthologized, studied, and adapted sketches. Both stories are often paired together in books and other representations, and both are included in surveys of early American literature and Romanticism. Irving's depictions of regional culture and his themes of progress versus tradition, supernatural intervention in the commonplace, and the plight of the individual outsider in a homogeneous community permeate both stories and helped to develop a unique sense of American cultural and existential selfhood during the early 19th century.

Adaptations

Film

 The Headless Horseman (1922), a silent film directed by Edward Venturini and starring Will Rogers as Ichabod Crane. It was filmed on location in New York's Hudson River Valley.
 The Adventures of Ichabod and Mr. Toad (1949), an animated adaptation directed by James Algar, Clyde Geronimi, and Jack Kinney, produced by Walt Disney Productions, and narrated by Bing Crosby. This version is more lighthearted and family-friendly than Irving's original story and most other adaptations, while the climactic chase is more extended than in the original story, and the possibility is stressed that the visually impressive Horseman is in fact a ghost rather than a human in disguise. It was rereleased individually in 1958 as The Legend of Sleepy Hollow.
 Sleepy Hollow (1999), a feature film adaption directed by Tim Burton which takes many liberties with the plot and characters, changing Crane from the local schoolmaster into a police constable sent from New York City to investigate recent murders, and the Horseman is used as a weapon against the local landowners. In the film, Brom Bones is portrayed as a more sympathetic character who, while antagonistic in the beginning, redeems himself as he engages in futile combat against the Horseman to help Crane escape.
 Sleepy Hollow High (2000), a direct-to-video horror film shot in Maryland, in which a group of misbehaving high school students are sent to the Sleepy Hollow Park Grounds to clean up vandalism and graffiti. They soon realize that someone is taking the original legend too far.
 The Smurfs: The Legend of Smurfy Hollow  retelling of the story by the Smurfs.

Television
 The 1979 CBS After School Special Once Upon a Midnight Scary, a three-story horror anthology of live-action shorts, narrated by Vincent Price, features a Sleepy Hollow segment with Rene Auberjonois as Ichabod Crane. The special itself was nominated for three Daytime Emmy Awards, winning for both Outstanding Children's Anthology/Dramatic Programming and Outstanding Achievement in Cinematography for a Children's Anthology/Dramatic Program, and a nomination for Auberjonois' performance as Crane.
 The Legend of Sleepy Hollow (1980), a television film directed by Henning Schellerup and filmed in Utah, starring Jeff Goldblum, Meg Foster, and Dick Butkus as Brom Bones. Executive producer Charles Sellier was nominated for an Emmy Award for his work on the movie. Crane is depicted as a skeptic regarding ghosts and the supernatural.
 "The Legend of Sleepy Hollow" (1985), the premiere episode of Shelley Duvall's Tall Tales and Legends series, stars Ed Begley Jr. as Ichabod Crane, Beverly D'Angelo as Katrina, Tim Thomerson as Brom, and Charles Durning as Doffue Van Tassel, who is also the narrator.
 "The Headless Motorcyclist", a 1987 episode of The Real Ghostbusters animated series about a descendent of Ichabod Crane being haunted by the same spirit who has adapted to the times by appearing as a headless punk motorcyclist.
 "The Tale of the Midnight Ride", a 1994 episode of the Nickelodeon series Are You Afraid of the Dark?, serves as a sequel to the original story. A boy named Ian Matthews moves to Sleepy Hollow, where he develops a crush on a girl named Katie. On Halloween night, they see the ghost of Ichabod Crane and send him over the bridge that the Headless Horseman cannot cross, unintentionally prompting the Horseman to pursue them instead of Crane.
 In the 1997 Wishbone episode "Halloween Hound: The Legend of Creepy Collars", Wishbone imagines himself as Ichabod Crane and reenacts the story in his imagination when his owner goes on a Halloween night scavenger hunt with two schoolmates, but is scared off by the Headless Horseman. 
 The Legend of Sleepy Hollow (1999), a Canadian-American television film directed by Pierre Gang and starring Brent Carver and Rachelle Lefevre. The production was nominated for three Gemini Awards: Best Actor (Carver), Best Original Music Score, and Best Production Design.
 The Night of the Headless Horseman (1999), an hour-long computer-animated TV special using motion capture.
 The Hollow (2004), an ABC Family television film starring Kevin Zegers and Kaley Cuoco, and focusing on a teenage descendant of Ichabod Crane.
 "The Legend of Sleepy Halliwell" (2004), an episode of the TV show Charmed, in which a headless horseman murders the teachers at Magic School by beheading them.
 Sleepy Hollow (2013), a crime/horror series in which Ichabod Crane is reimagined as an English professor and turncoat during the Revolutionary War, who awakens in the 21st century and encounters the Headless Horseman, a felled mercenary whom Crane had decapitated 250 years prior. Crane teams up with Abbie Mills, a lieutenant in the Sleepy Hollow sheriff's department, and together they try to stop the murderous Horseman and uncover a conspiracy involving supernatural forces. The show ran for four seasons.

Music
 In Sleepy Hollow (1913), a piano suite by Eastwood Lane
 "The Legend of Sleepy Hollow" (1958) by doo wop band The Monotones
 The Headless Horseman (2001) by Michael Jeffrey Shapiro, for baritone, itinerant string band, and orchestra
 "Undead Ahead 2: The Tale of the Midnight Ride" (2019), by Motionless in White
 "Sleepy Hollow" (2020), a single by hip-hop artist Trippie Redd

Theatre
 Sleepy Hollow (1948), a Broadway musical, with music by George Lessner and book and lyrics by Russell Maloney and Miriam Battista. It lasted 12 performances.
 Sleepy Hollow (2009), a musical with book and lyrics by Jim Christian and music by Tom Edward Clark.  It premiered at Weber State University in Ogden, Utah on October 30, 2009.  It received the 2009 Kennedy Center American College Theater Festival Musical Theatre Award.
 The Hollow (2011), a musical by Matt Conner and Hunter Foster. It premiered at the Signature Theatre Company in Arlington, Virginia.
 Sleepy Hollow - A Legendary Musical (2017), a musical by Michelle Ackerman.
 Tarrytown (2018), a musical by Adam Wachter. Its world premiere production at Backyard Renaissance Theatre Company won the 2018 San Diego Theatre Critics' Circle Craig Noel Award for "Best New Musical." A studio cast recording starring Jeremy Jordan, Krysta Rodriguez, and Andy Mientus was released in 2020 to benefit The Actors Fund's COVID-19 relief efforts.
 Ichabod: The Legend of Sleepy Hollow (2022), a new production combining Conner's 2011 score with a new book by Stephen Gregory Smith that stays truer to Irving's story.

Audio

 Ronald Colman was the host and narrator for a radio adaptation on NBC's Favorite Story on July 2, 1946 (requested by Walter Huston as that actor's favorite story).
 An adaptation was broadcast on September 19, 1947, on NBC University of the Air: American Novels.
 Bing Crosby recreated his Disney narration in Walt Disney's Ichabod and the Legend of Sleepy Hollow for Decca Records (DAU-725) in 1949.
 Lionel Barrymore narrated and wrote the music for a version of the story on Full Fidelity Lion Records (L70078), a branch of MGM Records, in 1958.
 In 1968, Ed Begley narrated the story in a Caedmon Records recording (TC-1242).
 Martin Donegan narrated the story in a 1968 recording for CMS Records (CMS 533).
 Hurd Hatfield narrated the story in a 1968 recording for Spoken Arts Records (SA 991).
 Boris Karloff was the narrator for an abridged version on a 1959 Cricket Records release, CR-32. This LP was subsequently reissued in 1977 as a Mr. Pickwick Records recording. (SPC-5156).
 In 1988, Glenn Close narrated a version of the story for Windham Hill Records (WH-0711), later also released on audio cassette and CD (WD-0711).
 Sleepy Hollow (1998) - An abridged version omitting the characters of Katrina and Brom, narrated by Winifred Phillips for the Radio Tales series on National Public Radio.
 In 2009 Historic Hudson Valley released an unabridged dramatic reading by Jonathan Kruk with musical effects by Matt Noble. 
 In 2005, BBC Radio 7 broadcast a three-part reading of the story narrated by Martin Jarvis, broadcast several times since on BBC Radio 4 Extra.
 Tom Mison, who starred as "Ichabod Crane" in the Fox television series Sleepy Hollow, narrated the story in 2014 for Audible Studios.
 In 2019, the radio program Adventures in Odyssey produced an adaptation of the story titled "Icky and Kat and Balty and Bones".
In 2020, the story was adapted into a full cast audio production by Shadows at the Door: the Podcast.

Comics 

 The 2022 graphic novel Hollow is based on the story.

Geographic impact

 Annually since 1996, before Halloween, the nonprofit organization Historic Hudson Valley has held "Legend Weekend", an event at the Philipsburg Manor House in Sleepy Hollow.
 In 1997, the village of North Tarrytown, New York (as the village had been called since the late 19th century), where many events of the story took place, officially changed its name to Sleepy Hollow. Its high school teams are named "the Horsemen".
 In 2006, a large sculpture depicting the Headless Horseman chasing Ichabod Crane was placed along Route 9 in Sleepy Hollow/Tarrytown, New York.

Place names

 Town and village names:
 Sleepy Hollow, New York, as the setting for the story, contains many of the referenced locations, including ones that can still be visited today, such as the Old Dutch Church, Horseman Bridge, and the Sleepy Hollow Cemetery, where Washington Irving's grave can be found, as can those of the real-life persons who lent their names to the story's characters. Today many street names reflect characters from the tale, and the Headless Horseman's likeness can be found on the village seal and everything from Sleepy Hollow High School's paraphernalia to the village fire trucks.
 Sleepy Hollow, Illinois, many of the street names reflect characters from the tale, and the image of the Headless Horseman can be found on many of the city's landmarks and publications.
 Sleepy Hollow, Marin County, California, has Irving Drive, Legend Road, Ichabod Court, Katrina Lane, Van Tassel Court, Baltus Lane, Crane Drive, Van Winkle Drive, and Knickerbocker Lane.
 Sleepy Hollow, Wyoming, has street names such as Pumpkin Court, Gunpowder Street, Ichabod Avenue, and Raven Street. Hosts an annual event called Sleepy Hollow Days.
Subdivision names:
 Bethel, Connecticut, "Sleepy Hollow Estates", Ichabod Lane, Legend Drive, and Katrina Circle.
 Roanoke, Virginia, and Longwood, Florida, "Sleepy Hollow", street names such as Ichabod and Horseman.
 Pearland, Texas, "Sleepy Hollow", street names such as Washington Irving Drive, Sleepy Hollow Drive, Crane Drive, Tarrytown Lane, and Brom Bones Boulevard in the neighborhood of Sleepy Hollow. 
 Port Jervis, New York, Sleepy Hollow Road
 Falls Church, Virginia, Street names Sleepy Hollow Road, Crane Drive, Ichabod Place, and Horseman Lane. There is also a Sleepy Hollow Park and Sleepy Hollow Bath & Racquet Club.
 Mt. Lebanon, Pennsylvania, Sleepy Hollow Road
 Breinigsville, Pennsylvania, Sleepy Hollow Lane
 Spinnerstown, Pennsylvania, Sleepy Hollow Road
 Hampden Township, Pennsylvania, "Sleepy Hollow", Ichabod Court, Brom Court, and Katrina Court.
 Amarillo, Texas, "Sleepy Hollow", Street names include Sleepy Hollow Blvd, Tarrytown Ave, Van Tassel St, Irving Ln, White Plains Ave, Legend Ave, etc.  The neighborhood also has its own elementary school named Sleepy Hollow Elementary.  Their mascot is the Horsemen.
Longwood, Florida, "Sleepy Hollow", Street names include Tarry Town Trail, Brom Bones Lane, Ichabod Trail,Katrina Cove, and Horseman Cove.
 State Parks:
 Sleepy Hollow State Park, Laingsburg, Michigan
 Schools:
 The Ichabod Crane School District, Valatie, New York. The school's sports teams are called "The Riders" and a silhouette of Ichabod Crane on his horse is often representative of the home team while a silhouette of the Headless Horseman is representative of the opponent. The wings in the junior high school are also named for characters and places, such as Katrina Van Tassel and Sleepy Hollow.
 The Ichabod Crane Schoolhouse, Kinderhook, New York .
Sleepy Hollow Elementary
 Orinda, California, has Washington Lane, Sleepy Hollow Lane, Tarry Lane, Van Ripper Lane, Van Tassel Lane, Tappan Lane, and Crane Court.
 Pinson, Alabama's Sleepy Hollow Subdivision has Sleepy Hollow Drive
 Walt Disney World's Sleepy Hollow quick service restaurant in Magic Kingdom theme park.
Rest Stop:
 Sleepy Hollow Rest area, New South Wales, Australia
On the Far North Coast of New South Wales lies the Sleepy Hollow rest stop. There is a stop located either side of the road so that North- and South-bound traffic is able to stop. The northbound stop is located 58 km north of Ballina and the southbound stop is located 32 km south of Tweed Heads.

Fire Station 59 in Artondale, Washington has adopted the nickname of "Sleepy Hollow", as the station is located in a remote, quiet subdivision within Pierce County.

See also

 Ghost films
 Ghost stories
 Sleepy Hollow Cemetery, founded in 1849, is adjacent to the Old Dutch Burying Ground. They are separately owned and administered.

References

Further reading
 Thomas S. Wermuth (2001). Rip Van Winkle's Neighbors: The Transformation of Rural Society in the Hudson River Valley. State University of New York Press. .

External links

 "The Legend of Sleepy Hollow" from The Harvard Classics (1917), hosted online at Bartleby.com.
 "The Legend of Sleepy Hollow" at American Literature.
 
 "Sleepy Hollow", a non-fiction description of the story's locale written by Washington Irving in 1839.
 Sleepy Hollow Cemetery. Founded in 1849, it is adjacent to but separate from the Old Dutch Burying Ground.
 
 
 
 

 
1820 short stories
American folklore
Horror short stories
Books illustrated by Arthur Rackham
Fiction set in 1790
Ghost stories
Halloween fiction
New York (state) in fiction
Short stories adapted into films
Short stories by Washington Irving
Works published under a pseudonym
History of Birmingham, West Midlands